Elaine Smith (born in Gooding, Idaho) is a Democratic Idaho State Representative representing District 29 in the B seat since 2012. She previously represented District 30 Seat B from 2002-2012. She is the House Minority Caucus Chair.

Early life and career 
Smith graduated from Meridian High School and earned her bachelor's degree in education-history from Idaho State University.

Elections

House of Representatives District 29 Seat B 
2018

Smith was unopposed for the Democratic primary.

She defeated Republican nominee Kevin James Brown and Libertarian nominee Idaho Lorax Carta with 54.0% of the vote.

2016

Smith was unopposed for the Democratic primary and the general election.

2014

Was unopposed for the Democratic primary.

She defeated Terrel "Ned" Tovey in the general election with 58.9% of the vote.

2012

Redistricted to 29B, Smith was unopposed for the Democratic primary.

She defeated Craig Cooper in the general election with 54.2% of the vote.

House of Representatives District 30 Seat B 
2010

Unopposed for the May 25, 2010, Democratic primary, Smith won with 1,418 votes, and won the November 2, 2010, general election with 4,900 votes (53.0%) against Dave Bowen (R).

2008

Unopposed for the May 27, 2008, Democratic primary, Smith won with 1,500 votes, and won the November 4, 2008, general election with 8,414 votes (56.9%) against Chris Stevens (R).

2006

Unopposed for the May 23, 2006, Democratic primary, Smith won with 1,389 votes, and won the three-party November 7, 2006, general election with 6,495 votes (6206%) against Republican nominee Joshua Thompson and Vegors, running as the United Party nominee.

2004

Unopposed for the May 25, 2004, Democratic primary, Smith won with 1,379 votes, and won the three-party November 2, 2004, general election with 8,375 votes (52.7%) against Paul Yochum (R) and Vegors (NL).

2002

When District 30 B seat Republican Representative Thomas Loertscher was re-districted to District 31, Smith was unopposed for the May 28, 2002, Democratic primary, winning with 2,078 votes, and won the three-party November 5, 2002, general election with 5,947 votes (53.3%) against Republican nominee Farhana Hibbert and Natural Law Party nominee Ann Vegors.

References

External links
 Elaine Smith at the Idaho Legislature
 

Year of birth missing (living people)
Living people
Idaho State University alumni
Democratic Party members of the Idaho House of Representatives
People from Gooding, Idaho
People from Pocatello, Idaho
Women state legislators in Idaho
21st-century American politicians
21st-century American women politicians